Shah Galdi may refer to:
 Shah Galdi, Fars
 Shah Galdi, Razavi Khorasan